Shirin Su District is a district (bakhsh) in Kabudarahang County, Hamadan Province, Iran. At the 2006 census, its population was 23,015, in 4,940 families.  The District has one city: Shirin Su. The District has two rural districts (dehestan): Mehraban-e Olya Rural District and Shirin Su Rural District.

References 

Kabudarahang County
Districts of Hamadan Province